Nkinga is a village and ward in Igunga district in Tabora Region in Tanzania. A Swedish Pentecostal missionary, Pastor Erland Jonsson, and his wife Ester Jonsson came to spread Christianity in Nyawa Kingdom in the mid-1930s. They established the first Pentecostal church in Igunga district and the first dispensary in the area in 1936.

The dispensary grew into a large hospital and was officially declared a hospital in 1960, serving patients from as far as Kigoma and other distant areas. The hospital still serves the region, under the management of missionaries from the Free Pentecostal Church of Tanzania and is called the Nkinga Referral Hospital.

Nkinga was also the first place where a missionary primary school was built. The Pentecostal missionary built the school in the early 1950s.

Nkinga is also the place where the missionaries built the first airport for small aircraft in Igunga district. 

The native people of Nkinga are Wanyamwezi, but members of other tribes have moved into the region, including Wanyiramba, Wasukuma, Wanyaturu and Waha. Popular foods in Nkinga include ugali and other Wanyamwezi foods like cassava, potatoes, rice and beans. 

A popular drink in Nkinga is the locally brewed beer, known as Makangala or Gongo. It is consumed secretly because its manufacture, supply and consumption is illegal in Tanzania.

Nkinga is now the second largest business centre in Igunga district after Igunga town itself.

Restaurants and guest houses are available for people who visit Nkinga either for business or to attend the hospital.

Shops are many in Nkinga from petty traders to wholesalers. Many people from neighbouring villages do visit a weekly auction, known as Gulio, every Saturday, in which traders from Nzega, Tabora and Igunga bring different consumer goods to sell.

Nkinga has many educational institutions, including Nkinga Nursing College, Nkinga Laboratory Institute and Nkinga English Medium School, which are run by the Free Pentecostal Church of Tanzania. Others are Ulaya secondary school and the government-run secondary school for Nkinga. The local primary schools are named Nkinga, Mwazumbi and Njiapanda.

Nkinga is the fastest growing village in Tabora region which attracts many businesses and workers to dwell in. In 2006, the population of Nkinga village itself was estimated at 6,000, with an increase of 360 people per year. The Nkinga ward, according to the 2002 census, has about 14,000 people.

References

Populated places in Tabora Region